Erik Kofoed-Hansen (30 January 1897 – 5 March 1965) was a Danish fencer. He competed in five events at the 1932 Summer Olympics.

References

1897 births
1965 deaths
Danish male fencers
Olympic fencers of Denmark
Fencers at the 1932 Summer Olympics
Sportspeople from Copenhagen